Coddington is a hamlet and civil parish in eastern Herefordshire, England, about  north of Ledbury. The west side of the parish covers part of the Malvern Hills, an official Area of Outstanding Natural Beauty. Coddington shares a parish council with neighbouring village of Bosbury.

Geography
The parish is small in area and population, with dispersed settlements and farms. Other places in the parish include Coddington Cross (at a crossroads on the main road through the parish, which does not pass through the hamlet of Coddington), Bush Farm, Pithouse Farm, Coddington Court, and Woofields Farm.

The Herefordshire Trail, a long-distance footpath, passes through the parish, calling at the vineyard, the church and Oyster Hill.

History
Coddington was recorded as a manor in the Domesday Book (1086), then spelled as Cotingtune. The manor was then held by the Bishop of Hereford.

The Ordnance Survey map of 1887 shows a school and a post office in the hamlet. It also shows two public houses: the Plough Inn and the Golden Cross Inn, on the lane between Coddington Court and Coddington Cross. All these amenities have since closed.

Coddington was home to Clyde Petroleum, established in the 1970s by a group of ex-Royal Dutch Shell employees.

The parish has many listed buildings, including several black and white half-timbered dwellings, of which Bush Farm is listed Grade II*.

Religion

The Church of England parish church of All Saints is a Grade II* listed building built largely in the 12th and 13th centuries. It features a broach spire. Church services are shared with nearby Colwall. The churchyard includes a Grade II* listed cross, whose base dates from the 14th century.

There is a Buddhist retreat and study centre at Coddington Court.

Demographics
The 2001 census gave Coddington a population of 108, and the two parishes of Bosbury and Coddington combined a population of 888. This fell by 8.5 per cent to 813 at the 2011 census, when the estimated population for Coddington was 99.

Politics
Coddington (with two seats) shares a parish council with a larger neighbour, Bosbury (eleven seats). They and the parishes of Colwall and Mathon form the ward of Hope End, which elects one member to Herefordshire Council. At the most recent election in May 2015, the Conservative candidate, Tony Johnson, won the seat. He has since been elected Leader of the Council. Coddington lies in the North Herefordshire parliamentary constituency, represented by Bill Wiggin (Conservative).

Notable people
Lionel George Curtis (1872–1955), a prominent advocate of one-world government, was born in Coddington. 
Sangharakshita (London-born Dennis Lingwood, 1925–2018), writer, commentator and founder of the Triratna Buddhist Community, lived in Coddington.

References

External links

Bosbury and Coddington Parish Council

Hamlets in Herefordshire
Civil parishes in Herefordshire